The House in Karp Lane is a 1965 West German drama film directed by Kurt Hoffmann and starring Jana Brejchová, Edith Schultze-Westrum and Wolfgang Kieling.

It portrays the Jewish residents of a Prague boarding house during the German occupation of Czechoslovakia. While the film received several awards, it was a major commercial failure. Hoffmann then returned to directing the comedies he was better known for.

The film was shot at the Barrandov Studios in Prague, and on location around the city.

Cast

References

Bibliography 
 Hans-Michael Bock and Tim Bergfelder. The Concise Cinegraph: An Encyclopedia of German Cinema. Berghahn Books, 2009.

External links 
 

1965 films
1965 drama films
German drama films
West German films
1960s German-language films
Films directed by Kurt Hoffmann 
Films set in Prague
Films shot in Prague
Films shot at Barrandov Studios
Films based on Israeli novels
Films set in 1939
Holocaust films
Czech resistance to Nazi occupation in film
German World War II films
1960s German films